Pong Ngam is a tambon (subdistrict) of Mae Sai District, in Chiang Rai Province, Thailand. In 2021 it had a total population of 12,367 people.

History
The subdistrict was created effective June 19, 1990 by splitting off 11 administrative villages from Pong Pha.

Administration

Central administration
The tambon is subdivided into 12 administrative villages (muban).

Local administration
The whole area of the subdistrict is covered by the subdistrict administrative organization (SAO) Pong Ngam (องค์การบริหารส่วนตำบลโป่งงาม).

References

External links
Thaitambon.com on Pong Ngam

Tambon of Chiang Rai province
Populated places in Chiang Rai province